Luis Alfonso García Etxebarria (born November 5, 1978 in Guadalajara, Mexico) is a former professional baseball designated hitter / first baseman.

García played in the Boston Red Sox, St. Louis Cardinals, Cleveland Indians, Los Angeles Dodgers, and New York Mets minor league systems from 1997  to 2005. He signed with the Sultanes de Monterrey of the Mexican League in 2005, playing with them until 2014. He spent the 2015 and 2016 seasons with the Leones de Yucatán, and the 2017 season with the Diablos Rojos del México. He played part of the 2018 season with the Guerreros de Oaxaca before he was released in early May. In June, he signed with the Generales de Durango, and was released in mid-August. He retired as an active player following the conclusion of the 2018 season, and later became the general manager of the Águilas de Mexicali in the Mexican Pacific League.

References 

 Luis Garcia at NPB (archive)

1978 births
Living people
Akron Aeros players
Arizona League Mexico Stars players
Augusta GreenJackets players
Baseball players from Jalisco
Buffalo Bisons (minor league) players
Diablos Rojos del México players
Generales de Durango players
Guerreros de Oaxaca players
Gulf Coast Red Sox players
Las Vegas 51s players
Leones de Yucatán players
Mexican expatriate baseball players in Japan
Mexican expatriate baseball players in the United States
Mexican League baseball first basemen
Mexican League baseball right fielders
Naranjeros de Hermosillo players
New Haven Ravens players
Nippon Professional Baseball first basemen
Norfolk Tides players
Pan American Games medalists in baseball
Pan American Games bronze medalists for Mexico
Sarasota Red Sox players
Sultanes de Monterrey players
Tohoku Rakuten Golden Eagles players
Trenton Thunder players
2006 World Baseball Classic players
2013 World Baseball Classic players
Baseball players at the 2007 Pan American Games
Medalists at the 2007 Pan American Games